Road is a Hungarian rock band from Domoszló, Heves County, Hungary. Formed in 2004, Road consists of bassist-singer Máté Molnár, guitarist Zsolt B. Golyán "Goya", guitarist Imre Kádár and drummer Erik Szabó. The band's lineup has not changed during its history so far.

Road's style of music – "Rock n' Road" – is a kind of characterful Hungarian countryside rock/heavy metal music. The guitar sound is distorted, the tempo is mainly energetic. Road also uses folkish motives in some of its songs, and the band has an acoustic repertoire, as well. They have already had special production together with a brass orchestra. Road is one of the most active rock bands in Hungary with high record sales and concert attendance.

Road has released six studio albums, a best of album, a live album, two DVD-s, eighteen music videos (one of them - "M.A.T.E." - is in English) so far and has also published a book of the band's story. Three of their albums has reached gold and two of them platinum status. The band still works in its members' childhood region called Mátraalja and they are on tour the whole of the year throughout Hungary as well as in trans-border areas inhabited by Hungarians.

Members
 Zsolt B. Golyán "Goya" – guitar
 Imre Kádár – guitar
 Máté Molnár – bass guitar and vocals
 Erik Szabó – drums

Albums

Videos

References
 Official website
 Official Facebook site
 An interview with the band in Hammer World magazine

Hungarian rock music groups
Hungarian heavy metal musical groups
Musical quartets
Musical groups established in 2004
2004 establishments in Hungary